The Ohio Cardinal Conference, which began play in 2003, is an OHSAA athletic league whose members are from Ashland, Holmes, Richland, and Wayne counties in Ohio.  The conference name stems from the local legacy of the Cardinal Conference.

The previous Cardinal Conference included: New Philadelphia, Dover, Coshocton, Ashland, Mansfield Malabar & Mansfield Madison.

History
In 2001, local athletic directors met in Mansfield, Ohio to discuss the formation of a new athletic conference; seven schools agreed to form the Ohio Cardinal Conference. Five of the initial member schools came from the disbanding Ohio Heartland Conference: Ashland, Lexington, Mansfield Madison, Mansfield Senior, and Orrville.  West Holmes joined from the Mohican-Area Conference, and Wooster from the Federal League.  Clear Fork, the only non-original member of the conference, joined for the 2004-05 season.

Bureaucratically, the conference had some early struggles.  The first conference commissioner, Jim Glauer, resigned in 2002 before the league even began play.  He was replaced by Ron Dessecker from Orrville, who remains the current commissioner.

Lexington High School has dominated the OCC athletically since the conference's inception.  It has won nine consecutive all-sports trophies, the award given to the school with the greatest success in all conference athletic competitions. It also has won the girls' tennis conference title every year in the conference's history and has won three state titles in that sport. The Lexington boys' tennis team won all but one conference title and two state titles in the same sport. Other schools have dominated specific sports in the same way: Madison has dominated the league in girls’ volleyball and baseball. Mansfield Senior has been the champion or co-champion in boys' basketball in 9 of 11 league seasons, Wooster has won all eleven boys' swimming and nine girls' swimming titles, Ashland had four running girls' soccer championships, and Mount Vernon has won every conference softball title since joining in 2016.

West Holmes High School revived discussions that had begun in 2007 with the East Central Ohio League to leave the Ohio Cardinal Conference effective the 2009-10 school year, which would have left the conference with an odd number of teams. West Holmes has since decided, at least for the time being, to remain in the Ohio Cardinal Conference.

An invitation for membership was extended to Triway High School in 2009, but Triway's administration voted to remain in the PAC-8.

In March 2015, Orrville was invited to join the PAC-8 in 2016 as a replacement for schools that are leaving that league.  As a result of the Red Riders' imminent departure, Mount Vernon was invited to replace them in 2016.

In March 2016, the OCC voted to kick out Clear Fork following the 2017-18 school year. The Colts will subsequently join the Mid-Ohio Athletic Conference in 2017-18 instead.

In April 2020, the OCC announced that New Philadelphia would join as their eighth member beginning in the 2022-23 school year.  The OCC agreed to let New Philadelphia continue to play their Week 10 football rivalry with Dover, which is currently the third-oldest in Ohio.

Members

Former members

Conference rivalries

Mansfield vs. Madison
Mansfield vs. Ashland
Mansfield vs. Lexington

Non-conference rivalries
Orrville vs. Wooster
West Holmes vs. Triway
West Holmes vs. Hiland
Lexington vs. Clear Fork
Madison vs. Shelby
Lexington vs. Ontario
Mansfield Sr. vs. Massillion Washington
Mount Vernon vs. Delaware Hayes

State championships
This table only includes state championships won by schools while a member of the Ohio Cardinal Conference:

Boys' league championships

Girls' league championships

All Sports Championships

See also

Ohio High School Athletic Conferences

References

External links
Ohio Cardinal Conference home

Ohio high school sports conferences